Ka'Raun White (born July 4, 1993) is a former American football wide receiver. He played college football at West Virginia. In his Mountaineer career, White caught 124 passes for 1,852 yards and 17 touchdowns. After going undrafted in the 2018 NFL Draft, White was signed by the Seattle Seahawks.

High school
White played high school football at Emmaus High School in Emmaus, Pennsylvania.

College
On the collegiate level, White played for West Virginia.

Professional career

Seattle Seahawks
White signed with the Seattle Seahawks as an undrafted free agent on May 4, 2018. He was waived three days later.

Cincinnati Bengals
On May 8, 2018, White was claimed off waivers by the Cincinnati Bengals. He was waived on September 1, 2018.

Pittsburgh Steelers
On January 3, 2019, the Pittsburgh Steelers signed White to a reserve/future contract. He was waived on May 13, 2019.

Personal life
White's older brother Kevin is a wide receiver who was drafted in the first round by the Chicago Bears in 2015 and later played for the New Orleans Saints and San Francisco 49ers. 

White's younger brother Kyzir is a linebacker who was drafted in 2018 by the Los Angeles Rams, where he played for three seasons, and then joined the Philadelphia Eagles during its 2022 Super Bowl season and now plays for the Arizona Cardinals.

References

External links
West Virginia Mountaineers bio

1997 births
Living people
American football wide receivers
Cincinnati Bengals players
Emmaus High School alumni
Pittsburgh Steelers players
Seattle Seahawks players
Sportspeople from Lehigh County, Pennsylvania
Sportspeople from the New York metropolitan area
West Virginia Mountaineers football players